Stephen Andrew Byrne (born 7 March 1986, Dublin, Ireland) is an Irish artist and animator noted for his work in animation, comic books, video games, and television. He is best known for his work on the Serenity comic with Joss Whedon and Chris Roberson, DC's Green Arrow  and his online animated shorts.

He was recently announced as the new artist for DC's  The Ray.

Biography
Byrne was born in Dublin. By age 12, he knew he was going to be an artist.

Byrne currently lives in Seattle, Washington working on Plants vs. Zombies Heroes.

His next project was Wonder Twins from DC comics in February 2019.

Comic book credits
Steve Loves Internet  – creator/writer/artist (webcomic, 2005)
 Trick 'r Treat: Days of the Dead  – artist (Legendary comics, 2015)
DOCTOR WHO: THE NINTH DOCTOR  #2:  – cover artist Titan Comics, 2016)
Dark Horse Announces 2016 Free Comic Book Day Gold Comic #6: "Serenity" (with Joss Whedon, and Chris Roberson, Dark Horse Comics, 2016)
Green Arrow #6, 7, 9 (with Benjamin Percy, DC Comics, 2016)

Video game credits
2014 Peggle 2, UI (PopCap Games, Electronic Arts)
2015 Peggle Blast, Art Lead (PopCap Games, Electronic Arts)
2016 Plants vs. Zombies Heroes, art director (PopCap Games, Electronic Arts) (with Kevin Hanna, Jordan Kotzebue and Chris Furnis)

References

Living people
1986 births
Irish animators